, better known by her stage name , is a Japanese actress and singer.

Biography
She attended Myōjō Academy in Mitaka, later transferring to and graduating from NHK Gakuen (NHK Academy). At age 7, she made her debut in the NTV television series Papa to Yobanai de. Her portrayal of a pregnant middle-school student in an episode of the TBS series Kinpachi-sensei brought widespread media exposure.

In the series Ikenaka Genta 80 Kilo, she not only played the female lead, but sang the song Tori no Uta, which was released and sold 280,000 copies, reaching number 10 on the weekly Oricon charts.

She has also appeared in the films such as Oh! Oku and Dead or Alive.

Filmography

Films
 Nutcracker Fantasy (1979)
 The Gate of Youth (1981)
 Tora-san Goes Religious? (1983)
 Dead or Alive (1999)
 Lakeside Murder Case (2004)
 Oh! Oku (2006)

Television
 Kinpachi-sensei (1979)
 Ikenaka Genta 80 Kilo (1980)
 Sanbiki ga Kiru! (1987)
 Nurse Aoi (2006)
 Kurosagi (2006)
 Fushin no Toki: Woman Wars (2006)

Bibliography
 Joyū Gokko (1998)

References

External links
 
 
 
 

1964 births
Living people
Japanese women singers
Japanese film actresses
Japanese television actresses
Japanese voice actresses
Actresses from Tokyo
Musicians from Shinjuku
20th-century Japanese actresses
21st-century Japanese actresses
Japanese child actresses